The Bay Shore Stakes is a Grade III American Thoroughbred horse race for three-year-olds at a distance of seven furlongs on the dirt run annually in early April at Aqueduct Racetrack in Ozone Park, Queens, New York.  The event currently offers a purse of $200,000.

History
The event was named for the resort town of Bay Shore, New York.

The name was once an event with the same name, Bay Shore Handicap, which was for three-year-olds and older and held in September. That event ended in 1955 with the closing of the old Aqueduct track. The track was closed until it was reconstructed in 1959. According to New York Racing Association the new event was inaugurated on 13 April 1960 as a race with an old name – Bay Shore Handicap for three-year-olds at a distance of one mile. The following year the name of the event was changed to the Bay Shore Stakes.

In 1964 the distance of the event was decreased to seven furlongs. The event began impacting the paths the three year old would take towards the U.S Triple Crown. In 1967, the winner Damascus continued his outstanding form winning the Preakness Stakes and Belmont Stakes and capturing a host of awards including U.S. Champion three-year-old colt, US Champion Handicap Horse and becoming US Horse of the Year. In 1968 Reviewer carried a record 130 pounds to victory in the first division of the event which was split. The 1970 US Champion Two-Year-Old Colt, Hoist The Flag won this event in 1971 with a new track record of 1:21 flat in what would be his last start as a career ending training incident forced a premature retirement. 

In 1973 the first year the classification system was enacted, the event was set with Grade III status.
Arguably, the most famous horse to have won this event was the 1973 winner Secretariat who won the race after an objection claim by  lengths, later that year becoming the U.S Triple Crown champion - the first after 25 years. In 1976 Bold Forbes set a new stakes record for the event in 1:20. Two starts later Bold Forbes would win the Kentucky Derby and be crowned the U.S. Champion three-year-old colt.

The event has been run at a shorter distance of 6 furlongs in 1977, 1978 and 1984 and on the inter track in 1994. 

The race has been run in split divisions in 1962, 1968, 1975, and 1986. 

The event was scheduled for 13 March 1993 but postponed twice due to bad weather before finally being cancelled.
In 2020 due to the COVID-19 pandemic in the United States, Aqueduct closed their track and the event was cancelled.

Records
Speed record:  
7 furlongs – 1:20.54  Limit Out (1998)

Margins: 
 lengths - Houston (1989)

Most wins by a jockey:
 5 – John Velazquez (1994, 1996, 2003, 2004, 2019)

Most wins by a trainer:
 3 –  Stanley R. Shapoff  (1974, 1988, 1991)
 3 – D. Wayne Lukas (1985, 1989, 1990)
 3 – Chad C. Brown (2014, 2015, 2017)
 3 – Todd A. Pletcher (2004, 2018, 2022)

Most wins by an owner:
 3 – Robert B. Cohen (1974, 1988, 1991)

Winners

Notes:

† Run on the Inner dirt track

See also
List of American and Canadian Graded races

References

1960 establishments in New York City
Horse races in New York City
Aqueduct Racetrack
Flat horse races for three-year-olds
Graded stakes races in the United States
Grade 3 stakes races in the United States
Recurring sporting events established in 1960